The pain model of behaviour management, which acknowledges that physical pain and psychological pain may inhibit learning, is a model developed for teachers who work with students who have extremely challenging behaviours, social problems and a lack of social skills. The model's strategies may also be used by teachers to prevent the development of challenging behaviours in the classroom.

The model was developed in Queensland, Australia early this decade by a team of behaviour support teachers led by Patrick Connor, an applied psychologist working as a guidance officer within this team. The teachers, who work within a Behaviour Management Unit work with children who can no longer attend school due to exclusions or suspension from school. The pain model is grounded in the work they have done with these students identified as high-risk; students whose behaviour has resulted in a referral to the Behaviour Management Unit – a service supplied to schools by some states in Australia.

Basis 

Connor drew on the work of Eric Berne and Harris  who researched the influences of past experiences on later behaviour, and O’Reilly (1994) and accepted the proposition of the neuro-physiological link between the brain and behaviour. 
Connor recognised, as far as learning was concerned, that there was little difference between the effect of physical pain and psychological pain. Both types of pain were debilitating and inhibited learning.

The pain model recognises that social problems such as homelessness, skill-lessness, meaninglessness, domestic violence, abuse, addiction or chemical or organic problems such as autism spectrum disorder (ASD) or attention deficit hyperactivity disorder (ADHD) cause psychological pain. When high-risk students (students that are experiencing one or more of these problems) are fearful, stressed and experiencing psychological pain teachers need to calm the student and relieve the pain before participation within the school environment can begin.

The model also allows the teacher to understand that the student’s behaviour is due to the pain they are experiencing making a less stressful classroom environment and allowing teachers to be more patient with students.

Assumptions 

 If students ‘feel good’ they will ‘act good’; if students ‘feel bad’ they will ‘act bad’.
 Behaviour is a type of communication and, because it is a type of communication schools may misinterpret the intended meaning of the message the student is sending through ‘bad’ behaviour.
 Students who act ‘bad’ may be unhappy and experiencing pain; inflicting punishment will only make this worse. Listening to students is more appropriate than punishing them.
 When young people are abused they cannot build primary relationships and often do not have the skills to participate in the class environment. They need to be taught these skills prior to gradual reintegration to the school.
 Traditional models of discipline are not effective with high-risk students.
 Some students ‘act bad’ in order to be punished and noticed. As a result, they are noticed for their behaviour not for who they are.

Principles 

 Acknowledge the pain
 Value the person

Preventative strategies 

 Develop relationships 
 Give clear instructions
 Care for teachers – support provided to teachers with ‘high-risk’ students.

Corrective strategies 

 Relieve the pain and calm the student – teach relaxation techniques, assess and address physical needs
 Re-skill the student – teach personal skills, interpersonal skills, academic skills and problem solving skills
 Reconstruct self-esteem – use slogans; set up for success; encourage
 Use related strategies - agreements; self-managing log; adjunctive therapies; collaboration with parents
 Refer on - deeper therapy.

School-wide strategies 

 Make school a welcoming place
 Create a welfare centre

Advantages 

 Less stress for teachers
 Better outcomes for high-risk students
 Long-term advantages for teachers and society
 Actively involves parents in process

Disadvantages 

 Resource intensive
 Change to whole school culture needed
 It is difficult for some teachers to relinquish power
 Some teachers expect naughty students to be punished
 Some aspects of the model are not suitable for use as general behaviour management for the majority of classes
 Relies upon all aspects of the child’s life supporting the basis of this model in order for it to be successful

References 

 Edwards, C. H., & Watts, V. (2004). Classroom discipline and management: An Australian perspective. Queensland: John Wiley and Sons Australia Ltd.

Behavior modification
Pain
School and classroom behaviour